The Provost of Montrose was the head of the Montrose burgh council in Scotland. Provosts were elected by the council and served not only as the chairman of that body, but as a figurehead for the entire town. They were equivalent in many ways to the institution of mayor.

Each of the 32 Scottish local authorities elects a convener or provost, but it is only the four main cities, Glasgow, Edinburgh, Aberdeen and Dundee that have a Lord Provost. This is enshrined in the Local Government etc. (Scotland) Act 1994.

Provosts
c. 1419-?	John Setoun
c. 1430-?	Alexander 
c. 1431-?	Patrick Barclay
c. 1434-?	David Rukby
c. 1493-?, ?-1498-?	Walter Ogilvy of Rynd
c.1517-?	Mr Thomas Erskine
c. 1553-?, 	John Erskine, 5th of Dun
c. 1567-?	John Erskine, 5th of Dun
c. 1596-1599-?	Robert Lichtoun, fiar of Usan
?	William Ramsay
?	George Petrie
c.1624-?	John Tailyour
1627	James Scott, 2nd of Logie
c. 1634-?	Robert Keith of Powburn (Bradieston & Scotston)
?	Robert Beattie
?	Andrew Gray
c. 1663-1668	Robert Tailyour of Borrowfield
?	Robert Gardyne
c.1673-?, 	Robert Rennald (Ronald) (I)
1677-1678, 	John Coutts of Fullarton
c. 1681-?	Robert Rennald (Ronald) (I)
1682-1684, 	John Coutts of Fullarton
1687-1688	John Coutts of Fullarton
c.1690-1691 	Robert Arbuthnott
c.-1702- 	Robert Rennald (Ronald) (II)
c.-1703 	William Coutts
c. 1704- 	Charles Ogilvie
c.-1706-1707 	Robert Turnbull
c.. 1708- 	James Mudie of Arbikie
1710 	James Scott, 5th of Logie
bef. 1713	James Milne (Mill) of Balwyllo in Dun
1716-1717	Alexander Strachan of Tarrie
1722	James Scott, 5th of Logie
 	Lt-col. Robert Reid
1727  	James Coutts of Halgreenin Bervie
1731-1733,	James Coutts of Halgreen in Bervie
1733-1735	David Skinner
1735-1737	John Coutts
1737-1739	James Coutts of Halgreen in Bervie
1739-1741	David Skinner, jun.
1741-1743	James Coutts of Halgreenin Bervie
1743-1746	David Skinner of Cononsyth
1746-1747  	David Doig of Cookston
1747-1749	William Ross
1749-1751 	David Doig of Cookston
1751-1753	George Ross
1753-1755	David Doig of Cookston
1757-1761	David Doig of Cookston
1761-1763	James Bisset
1763-1765	Thomas Christie
1765-1767	Alexander Christie
1767-1769	William Christie
1769-1771	Alexander Christie
1773-1775	Alexander Christie
1775-1777	James Bisset
1777-1779	James Low
1779-1781	Alexander Christie
1781-1783  	Adam Glegg
1783-1785 	Thomas Webster
1785-1787 	Adam Glegg
1787-1789 	Thomas Webster
1789-1791 	Adam Glegg
1791-1793	Thomas Webster
1793-1795	Adam Glegg
1797-1799 	James Lyall
1799-1801	James Paton
1801-1803	James Lyall
1803-1805 	James Paton
1805-1807  	Andrew Thom
1807-1808	James Paton
1808-1810, 	Patrick Craigie
1810- 1812	Andrew Thom
1812-1814	Patrick Craigie
1814-1816	Andrew Thom
1816-1818	Charles Barclay
1818-1820, 	James Burnes
1820-1822	William Gibson, M.D.
1822-1824	William Jamieson
1824-1825	James Burnes 
1825-1827	William Jamieson
1827-1829 	George Paton
1829-1830	William Jamieson
1830-1832	George Paton
1832-1835	John Barclay, jun.
1835-1839	George Crawford
1839-1842	William Sim
1842-1844	George Paton
1844-1847	William Jameson
1847-1850	David Mackie
1850-1852	James Calvert
1852-1855	David Mackie
1855-1856	George Hall
1856-1861	Thomas Napier
1861-1864	James Savege
1864-1869, 	William Mitchell
1869-1872	Robert Barclay of Inchbrayock
1872-1875	William Mitchell
1875-1878	John [Gardyne] Milne
1878-1881	James William Japp
1881-1884	David Lackie
1884-1887	John Reid
1887-1890	George Scott
1890-1891	George Watson Middleton
1891-1900	James Mitchell
1900-1906	William Fotheringham Melvin
1906-1909	Joseph Foreman, O.B.E.
1909-1912	Valentine Stone, M.D., F.R.C.S.E.
1912-1920	Alexander Thomson
1920-1925	Joseph Foreman
1925-1931	William Douglas Johnston, O.B.E.
1931-1934	Thomas Lyell
1934-1937	Hugh Hanton Soutar
1937-1943	Andrew Duff Todd
1943-1946	Andrew Wemyss Ritchie
1946-1950	William Coull
1950-1953	John Butchart
1953-1955	Joseph Calder Cameron
1955-1967 	William Johnston

Madge Mitchell
James Milne

References
Records, sources & information about the Parish and Royal Burgh of Montrose

Montrose
Politics of Angus, Scotland